The Review of International Political Economy is a bimonthly peer-reviewed academic journal covering international political economy. The journal was established in 1994, and is published by Routledge. The editor-in-chief is Lena Rethel (University of Warwick).

According to the Journal Citation Reports, the journal has a 2021 impact factor of 4.146.

References

External links

Bimonthly journals
English-language journals
Political science journals
Publications established in 1994
Routledge academic journals